Yvette Biro is a Hungarian-American essayist, screenwriter (April 3rd, 1930, Budapest) and Professor Emeritus at New York University Graduate Film School (NYU). 

Her early books on the aesthetics of film were first published in her native Hungary, which became handbooks for film-schools in the country. Meanwhile, she worked on a dozen of prizewinning films with noted directors (Miklós Jancsó, Zoltán Fábri, Károly Makk). She was both the founder and the Editor-in-Chief of Filmkultura, the magazine of the Hungarian Film Institute and Film Archive.

In the mid-1970s, she was "offered" the chance to emigrate by the Hungarian authorities. After teaching at the Sorbonne in Paris, she moved to the US to teach at the Universities of Berkeley and Stanford, California. In 1982 she was hired as a professor then became Full Professor on the faculty of the Tisch School of the Arts (Film and TV Graduate Division) at NYU where she worked until her retirement in 2007. 

She has written books on film which have been translated into several languages. Her numerous essays have been published in professional magazines internationally – Film Quarterly, Études Cinématographiques , Performing Arts Journal, Bianco & Nero, Dædalus, Millennium, and The Village Voice, as well as in online publications.

Works

Theory and criticism 
1982 - Profane Mythology: The Savage Mind of the Cinema, Indiana University Press
2008 - Turbulence and Flow in Film, Indiana University Press

Scripts 
1995 - Arrivals and Departures (film, unproduced) - winner of the European Script Fund Award
2003 - The Stone Raft (film)
2006 - Johanna (film)
2008 - Delta (film) - winner of the FIPRESCI Prize in Cannes 
2010 - Tender Son
2009 - Judasevangelium, with Kornél Mundruczó (opened at the Hamburg Thalia Theatre in September 2009)
2007/2008 - The Frankenstein Project (European tour including Brussels, Paris, Vienna)

References

External links
 
 

American women screenwriters
Living people
Hungarian emigrants to the United States
Tisch School of the Arts faculty
1930 births
Writers from Budapest
Hungarian women